Zářecká Lhota is a municipality and village in Ústí nad Orlicí District in the Pardubice Region of the Czech Republic. It has about 200 inhabitants.

Paleontology

In 1880, the first and still the only known Czech pterosaur fossil (now known as Cretornis hlavaci) was found in a nearby quarry.

References

Villages in Ústí nad Orlicí District